Tommaso Zafferani (born 19 February 1996) is a Sammarinese footballer who currently plays for La Fiorita.
He has been capped by the San Marino national football team, making his debut in 2016.

References

Living people
Sammarinese footballers
1996 births
Association football midfielders
San Marino international footballers